Events in the year 1948 in China.

Incumbents
President: Chiang Kai-shek
Vice President: Li Zongren
Premier: Zhang Qun
Vice Premier: Wang Yunwu (until April 24)

Events

April
 20 April - 1948 Republic of China presidential election

May
 23 May - 19 October - Siege of Changchun

June
 17–19 June - Battle of Shangcai

September
 12 September - 2 November - Liaoshen Campaign
 16–24 September - Battle of Jinan

October
 7–15 October - Battle of Jinzhou
 10–15 October - Battle of Tashan

November
 Early November - Boiler and ammunition explosion aboard an unidentified merchant ship evacuating troops of the Republic of China Army from Yingkou for Taiwan.

December
1 December – People's Bank of China was established in Shijiazhuang, this financial service was transfer to Beijing in 1949.

Births
 30 January - Wu Den-yih, Vice President of the Republic of China.
 9 March - Chang Jin-fu, former Governor of Taiwan Province.
 7 April - Hung Hsiu-chu, Vice President of Legislative Yuan.
 5 May - Jeffrey Tao, interpreter.
 4 October - Mao Chi-kuo, former Premier of the Republic of China.

Deaths
 25 May - Dong Cunrui
 22 November - Huang Baitao
 Lu Zhiying
 Liu Kan
 Kong Xianrong
 Yoshiko Kawashima

See also
 List of Chinese films of the 1940s

References

 
1940s in China
Years of the 20th century in China